Louis-Charles-François Ledru (1778–1861) was a French architect.

Early life
Louis-Charles-François Ledru was born in 1778 in Paris, France. He graduated from the École Polytechnique, where Gaspard Monge was one of his professors. He subsequently took a course in architecture taught by Jean-Nicolas-Louis Durand.

Career
Ledru became a member of the Académie royale d'architecture circa 1794.

Ledru moved to the Auvergne in 1810, where he started a business in asphalt extraction. By 1811, he designed the spa in Le Mont-Dore. By 1820, he designed the townhall, the jailhouse, the slaughterhouse, the market, etc., in Clermont-Ferrand, where he was appointed as chief architect in 1823. He also designed the courthouse in Thiers and a government building in Ambert.

Ledru was awarded the Legion of Honour in 1841.

Philanthropy
With Mayor Antoine Blatin, Ledru co-founded a school in Clermont-Ferrand where mathematics, architecture and drawing were taught free of charge.

Death
Ledru died on September 16, 1861.

References

1778 births
1861 deaths
Architects from Paris
École Polytechnique alumni
19th-century French architects
Members of the Académie d'architecture
Recipients of the Legion of Honour